Maršić is a settlement in the municipality of Kragujevac, Serbia. According to the 2011 census, the settlement has a population of 267 inhabitants.

Population

References

Populated places in Šumadija District